The Convention on the Taking of Evidence Abroad in Civil or Commercial Matters—more commonly referred to as the Hague Evidence Convention—is a multilateral treaty which was drafted under the auspices of the Hague Conference on Private International Law (HCPIL). The treaty was negotiated in 1967 and 1968 and signed in The Hague on 18 March 1970. It entered into force in 1972. It allows transmission of letters of request (letters rogatory) from one signatory state (where the evidence is sought) to another signatory state (where the evidence is located) without recourse to consular and diplomatic channels. Inside the US, obtaining evidence under the Evidence Convention can be compared to comity.

The Hague Evidence Convention was not the first convention to address the transmission of evidence from one state to another. The 1905 Civil Procedure Convention—also signed in The Hague—contained provisions dealing with the transmission of evidence. However, that earlier convention did not command wide support and was only ratified by 22 countries.

Substantive provisions

Central authorities and procedures
The convention establishes a procedure whereby each contracting state designates a "central authority" to receive and review incoming "letters of request" for taking evidence in that country.  

The central authority reviews the letter of request to determine that it complies with the requirements of the convention.  If the letter of request does comply, the central authority then "transmits" the letter of request "to the authority competent to execute" it (article 2), which essentially means to a court.

Under Article 9, the judicial authority that executes a letter of request applies its own law as to the methods and procedures for executing the letter of request.

Under article 13, (a) the documents establishing the execution of the letter of request are to be sent by the requested authority (the recipient of the letter of request) to the requesting authority by the same channel that was used by the requesting authority, and (b) whenever the letter of request is not executed (in whole or in part), the requesting authority is to be informed immediately and advised of the reasons.

Pre-trial discovery
The convention also applies to pre-trial discovery: obtaining of evidence prior to trial without the prior approval of a judge. While this is a common practice in many common law countries, it was felt unacceptable by many others. Countries can however object to application to pre-trial discovery through an objection according to Article 23. As of April 2019, the convention applies to pre-trial discovery in 15 countries. 26 states have objected fully excluding pretrial discovery, while 17 others have restricted its applicability.

An example of a partial objection to pre-trial discovery is from Mexico, requiring the start of the judicial proceedings, identifiability of the documents and a clear relationship between the requested documents and the pending proceedings:

C) FORMULATION OF PRE-TRIAL DISCOVERY OF DOCUMENTS
4. With reference to Article 23 of the Convention, the United Mexican States declares that according to Mexican law, it shall only be able to comply with letters of request issued for the purpose of obtaining the production and transcription of documents when the following requirements are met: 
(a) that the judicial proceeding has been commenced; 
(b) that the documents are reasonably identifiable as to date, subject and other relevant information and that the request specifies those facts and circumstances that lead the requesting party to reasonable believe that the requested documents are known to the person from whom they are requested or that they are in his possession or under his control or custody;
(c) that the direct relationship between the evidence or information sought and the pending proceeding be identified.

Parties

As of 2021, there are 63 states which are parties of the Hague Evidence Convention. Fifty-six of the HCPIL member states are party to the Hague Evidence Convention. In addition, six states that are not members of the HCPIL (Barbados, Colombia, Kuwait, Liechtenstein, Nicaragua and Seychelles) have joined the Hague Evidence Convention. Article 39 of the Hague Evidence Convention expressly permits states which were not members of the HCPIL at the time of the conclusion of the treaty to accede to the Convention.

Practical operation in member states
At least two member states authorize private lawyers to be involved in the evidence-gathering process.  Under the law of the British Virgin Islands, if a witness is summoned to testify pursuant to a letter of request, a legal practitioner for any party may administer the oath to the witness.
  
The availability of a private lawyer to be directly involved is even more broad under Israeli law.  As noted above, Israel has not issued an article 23 declaration.  Israeli law provides, pursuant to the Legal Assistance Among States Law 1998, for the possibility of the appointment of a private lawyer to oversee the process of taking evidence under the convention.  That statute also governs the procedure for evidence-gathering in Israel in aid of foreign criminal investigations.  As a result, even in civil matters (including Hague Evidence Convention requests), the Israeli court system usually assigns letters of request to judges in the criminal division.  Due to that allocation, most Israeli decisions issued in connection with international evidence-gathering are stamped "closed doors," which essentially means that it is unlawful to publish the decision.

The American Bar Association conducted a survey to receive feedback from American lawyers concerning their experience with the letter of request procedures under the Hague Evidence Convention.  The ABA published the results of the survey in October 2003, and its Conclusions section begins as follows:

The Hague Evidence Convention has been remarkably successful in bridging differences between the common law and civil law approaches to obtaining evidence and has significantly streamlined the procedures for compulsion of evidence from abroad.

Obtaining evidence outside the convention
Insofar as requests to United States courts are concerned, parties may also use the simpler discovery provision codified at 28 U.S.C. § 1782 (see Section 1782 Discovery).

Between states of the European Union, the convention has largely been supplanted by Council Regulation (EC) No. 1206/2001 on Cooperation Between the Courts of the Member States in the Taking of Evidence in Civil or Commercial Matters.

References

External links
Hague Evidence Convention at the Hague Conference website
Ratifications

Treaties concluded in 1970
Treaties entered into force in 1972
Hague Conference on Private International Law conventions
Evidence law
Treaties of Albania
Treaties of Andorra
Treaties of Argentina
Treaties of Armenia
Treaties of Australia
Treaties of Barbados
Treaties of Belarus
Treaties of Bosnia and Herzegovina
Treaties of Brazil
Treaties of Bulgaria
Treaties of the People's Republic of China
Treaties of Colombia
Treaties of Costa Rica
Treaties of Croatia
Treaties of Cyprus
Treaties of the Czech Republic
Treaties of Czechoslovakia
Treaties of Denmark
Treaties of Estonia
Treaties of Finland
Treaties of France
Treaties of West Germany
Treaties of Greece
Treaties of Hungary
Treaties of Iceland
Treaties of India
Treaties of Israel
Treaties of Italy
Treaties of Kazakhstan
Treaties of Kuwait
Treaties of Latvia
Treaties of Liechtenstein
Treaties of Lithuania
Treaties of Luxembourg
Treaties of Malta
Treaties of Montenegro
Treaties of Mexico
Treaties of Morocco
Treaties of Monaco
Treaties of the Netherlands
Treaties of Nicaragua
Treaties of North Macedonia
Treaties of Norway
Treaties of Poland
Treaties of Portugal
Treaties of Romania
Treaties of Russia
Treaties of Serbia
Treaties of Seychelles
Treaties of Singapore
Treaties of Slovakia
Treaties of Slovenia
Treaties of South Africa
Treaties of South Korea
Treaties of Spain
Treaties of Sri Lanka
Treaties of Sweden
Treaties of Switzerland
Treaties of Turkey
Treaties of Ukraine
Treaties of the United Kingdom
Treaties of the United States
Treaties of Venezuela
1970 in the Netherlands
Treaties extended to Ashmore and Cartier Islands
Treaties extended to the Australian Antarctic Territory
Treaties extended to Christmas Island
Treaties extended to the Cocos (Keeling) Islands
Treaties extended to Heard Island and McDonald Islands
Treaties extended to Norfolk Island
Treaties extended to Aruba
Treaties extended to Akrotiri and Dhekelia
Treaties extended to Anguilla
Treaties extended to the Cayman Islands
Treaties extended to the Falkland Islands
Treaties extended to Gibraltar
Treaties extended to Guernsey
Treaties extended to the Isle of Man
Treaties extended to Jersey
Treaties extended to Guam
Treaties extended to Puerto Rico
Treaties extended to the United States Virgin Islands
Treaties extended to the Coral Sea Islands
Treaties extended to South Georgia and the South Sandwich Islands
Treaties extended to Portuguese Macau
Treaties extended to British Hong Kong
Treaties extended to West Berlin
20th century in The Hague
Judicial cooperation